Arne Morten Berner (15 November 1927 – 9 December 1988) was a Finnish liberal politician who held many ministerial offices.

Career
He served as a Member of Parliament for six years from 1966–1972. From 1970–1971 he was appointed as both Minister of Trade and Industry and Deputy Minister of Health and Social Affairs. He was appointed as Minister of Trade and Industry again from 1976–1977. In 1982, he was appointed as Deputy Minister of Foreign Affairs, Deputy Minister of Trade and Industry and Chairman of the Liberal People's Party.

Personal life
His grandfather Sören Berner founded the family company Berner in 1883. His father Rolf B. Berner and his older brothers Harry Berner and Erik Berner were all CEOs of the company. Arne worked as a manager.

See also
 List of Cabinet Ministers from Finland by ministerial portfolio

References

1927 births
1988 deaths
Ministers of Trade and Industry of Finland
Finnish diplomats
Members of the Parliament of Finland (1966–70)
Members of the Parliament of Finland (1970–72)
Politicians from Helsinki
Liberals (Finland) politicians
Finnish people of Norwegian descent